Kink is a 2013 American documentary film produced by James Franco about the BDSM website Kink.com. The film was originally released in January 2013 and had a staggered release worldwide in 2013 and 2015.

Early production
While filming scenes of About Cherry at the Kink.com San Francisco Armory, Franco noticed the dynamic between actors and the production crew. He stated that this interested him, as in some respects, it was a similar dynamic to that of the production at Saturday Night Live. It was this that led to Franco developing an interest in this aspect of the BDSM culture. After coaxing director Christina Voros to an interview at the Armory, she agreed to do the film. The other reported influence for Franco's decision to make this documentary was an unsuccessful sex tape with his girlfriend.

People featured/appearing 
 Peter Acworth
 Maitresse Madeline
 Chris Norris
 Van Darkholme
 Ricky Sinz
 James Deen
 Mr. Marcus
 Zoe Holiday
 Jon Jon
 Jessie Lee
 Tomcat
 Princess Donna
 Fivestar
 Francesca Le
 Phoenix Marie
 Ash Hollywood
Remy LaCroix

Reception
On Rotten Tomatoes the film has an 88% rating based on 8 reviews.
On Metacritic the documentary has a score of 67 out of 100 based on reviews from 8 critics.

A review by Slant Magazine'''s Drew Hunt said, "More than just a thorough examination of hardcore pornography, Christina Voros’s doc is also a sort of chronicle of the filmmaking process," and also "This intriguing paradox contributes to the familiar but no less truthful idea that appearances are often deceiving; rarely is that more exhilaratingly evident than in Kink."

A 2014 article by The New York Times'' called the documentary a "well done in-depth look into the industry."

See also
 Graphic Sexual Horror

References

External links
 

2013 documentary films
2013 films
American documentary films
BDSM in films
BDSM-related mass media
Documentary films about American pornography
2010s English-language films
2010s American films